Richard Eugene Mandella (born November 5, 1950 in Altadena, California), is a Thoroughbred horse trainer and a member of the U.S. Racing Hall of Fame.

Mandella's father, a blacksmith, introduced him to horses at an early age and while still in high school he began starting and training horses at a nearby ranch.  He spent a year in New York as assistant to Lefty Nickerson and then took a job with Texas horseman Roger Braugh in 1974.

Two years later, Mandella returned to California and opened his own stable.  His wins began almost immediately with Bad 'n Big and continued with Phone Trick, Dare and Go, and Pleasantly Perfect.  Between 1996 and 1998, Mandella won six straight million dollar races in Southern California with Dare and Go, Siphon, Gentlemen, and Malek. He has started six horses in the Kentucky Derby.

Mandella was inducted into the U.S. Racing Hall of Fame in 2001, and in 2003 he had four winners in the Breeders' Cup: Pleasantly Perfect, Johar, Halfbridled, and Action This Day.

In 2006, Mandella wrote the introduction to Santa Anita Morning Rhapsody, by photographer-author Karen S. Davis, a book documenting morning thoroughbred racetrack training. "Most people who enjoy racing don't realize how special these early hours are, watching ... the relationship between horse and man," he wrote.

In 2019, he ended his 13-year drought for stakes races outside of California. After remaining winless outside of his home state since winning the Arlington Million in 2006, Mandella captured the Rebel Stakes and Arkansas Derby with Omaha Beach.

Mandella lives in Bradbury, California, with his wife Randi, son Gary (also a trainer), and daughter Andrea.

References
 Thoroughbred Times
 "On the Muscle" documentary about Richard Mandella's racing stable
 Mandella's Perfect Day (2003 Breeder's Cup)
 National Racing Hall of Fame - Richard Mandella
 Richard Mandella at the NTRA

American horse trainers
United States Thoroughbred Racing Hall of Fame inductees
1950 births
Living people
People from Altadena, California
People from Bradbury, California